Harmby is a village and civil parish in Lower Wensleydale very near to Leyburn, in the Richmondshire district of North Yorkshire, England. It is closely connected with Spennithorne, half a mile away. The sports associations of the two villages are linked.

The waterfall at Harmby is accessed via one of two footpaths from the main road, near the top of Harmby Bank, across from the Pheasant Inn.

Edward Baines, in his 1823 directory, lists the village as Harnby and gives the population as 194.

This small community has few businesses; the largest are the Pheasant Inn and the Lower Wensleydale Caravan Club Site (caravan park).

References

External links

Villages in North Yorkshire
Civil parishes in North Yorkshire
Wensleydale